Jan Patrik Carnbäck (born February 1, 1968) is a Swedish former professional ice hockey player.

Playing career 
Patrik started playing ice hockey at age 8, with the local club IFK Bäcken. After five years with Bäcken he joined Västra Frölunda HC. At age 17 he started playing with Frölunda's elite team, at the time in Swedish hockey's Division 1. Patrik and Frölunda played three seasons in Division 1 before advancing to Elitserien in 1989. During these three seasons, Carnbäck played 83 games, scoring 49 goals and 49 assist for a total of 98 points.

In his first season in Elitserien (1989–90), Patrik ended up second in the scoring race with a total of 54 points, as a rookie. He won Rookie of the year, voted ahead of Mats Sundin. Trailing him in the scorings race were some top notch scoring machines, Håkan Loob (53), Bengt-Åke Gustafsson (46), Peter Gradin (46), Thomas Rundqvist (46), Anders Carlsson (43) and Lars-Gunnar Pettersson (42). The only player to finish ahead of him was AIK's Robert Burakovsky with 57 points. His success in Elitserien lead to his debut with the national team in November, 1989.

In the 1992 World Championships he was one of the best players for team Sweden. He started the tournament playing with Mats Sundin and Peter Forsberg. After a disappointing tie game, 0-0, against team Italy he formed a line with newly arrived, NHL player Mikael Andersson and Daniel Rydmark. They became Sweden's new offensive weapon. In the tournament final, Carnbäck was named "best player of the game."

After his success in the World Championships and his play in Elitserien, the Montreal Canadiens decided to bring him over the pond. However, Patrik didn't manage to get a roster spot in Montreal and played most of the season with Montreal's farm team, the Fredericton Canadiens.

On August 10, 1993, Montreal traded Patrik and Todd Ewen to the Mighty Ducks of Anaheim for their 3rd round choice (Chris Murray) in the 1994 Entry Draft. He had more success in Anaheim and was a regular on the team in his first season. He played three seasons with the Ducks before signing with the Kölner Haie of the DEL.

Awards 
Elitserien Rookie of the Year in 1990.
Named to the Elitserien All-Star Team in 2000.

Career statistics

Regular season and playoffs

International

Notes and references

Notes

References

External links

1968 births
Fredericton Canadiens players
Frölunda HC players
Ice hockey players at the 1992 Winter Olympics
Kölner Haie players
Living people
Mighty Ducks of Anaheim players
Montreal Canadiens draft picks
Montreal Canadiens players
Olympic ice hockey players of Sweden
Ice hockey people from Gothenburg
Swedish ice hockey right wingers